Manuela Schultealbert (born 15 January 1973) is a German women's international footballer who plays as a defender. She is a member of the Germany women's national football team. She was part of the team at the UEFA Women's Euro 1993.

References

1973 births
Living people
German women's footballers
Germany women's international footballers
Place of birth missing (living people)
Women's association football defenders
People from Ochtrup
Sportspeople from Münster (region)
Footballers from North Rhine-Westphalia